The 2006 Silverstone Superbike World Championship round was the fifth round of the 2006 Superbike World Championship. It took place on the weekend of 26–28 May 2006 at Silverstone.

Results

Superbike race 1 classification

Superbike race 2 classification

Supersport race classification

References
 Superbike Race 1
 Superbike Race 2
 Supersport Race

Silverstone Round
Silverstone Superbike